Stanton Moor is a small upland area in the Derbyshire Peak District of central northern England, lying between Matlock and Bakewell near the villages of Birchover and Stanton-in-Peak.  It is known for its megaliths – particularly the Nine Ladies stone circle – and for its natural, wind-eroded sandstone pillars. The Peak District Boundary Walk runs across the moor.

Geology

Stanton Moor consists of an outlier of Millstone Grit, known as Ashover Grit. This is a coarse-grained sandstone which weathers to produce coarse sub-soils, rich in sand, and the soils themselves are typically podzols. The Ashover Grit sandstone layer lies on top of shale, which in turn lie upon Carboniferous limestone. The whole of the moor is of geological interest as a syncline.
 
Several large, wind-eroded pillars of sandstone are found around the edge of Stanton Moor, and form significant features of its topography. From north, clockwise, these outcrops are the Duke of York Stone (in which the legend "Y 1826" is carved), the Cat Stone, the Duchess of Sutherland Stone, the Gorse Stone, the Heart Stone (9 metres high), the Cork Stone (5 metres high) and the Andle Stone.

The moor's sandstone has been quarried for many years, and has left several old dormant quarries around the moor. In 2009 an attempt to re-open dormant quarries failed after much local and national protest that had lasted for over ten years.

A large part of Stanton Moor is designated as a Regionally Important Geological Site (RIGS) because of the unusual nature of its sandstones. Much of the vegetation that grows on the moor is upland heathland, regarded as a both local and national priority Biodiversity Action Plan (BAP) Habitat.

Archaeology

There are more than 70 barrows on the moor, mostly on the southern side and often difficult to discern. Most of them were excavated between 1927 and the early 1950s by the local archaeologist J.C.Heathcote and his son, J.P.Heathcote. They exhibited their finds in a private museum in nearby Birchover.

The moor has four Bronze Age stone circles, of which the best known is Nine Ladies.  To its north lies "Stanton Moor I" (the "North Circle"), and to its south are "Stanton Moor III" (the "Central Circle") and "Stanton Moor IV" (the "South Circle").  These other circles are largely overgrown and have few remaining stones.  A further circle, Doll Tor, lies a short distance west of the moor. Elsewhere on the moor lie a number of modern-day cairns.

Stanton Moor is a designated Scheduled Ancient Monument. English Heritage has commissioned a conservation plan for Stanton Moor from the Peak District National Park Authority.

Other structures

On the eastern edge of the moor is the Reform or Earl Grey Tower, built by William Pole Thornhill and dedicated to the Reform Act 1832.

On the north side of the moor is a large TV transmitter which relays broadcasts from  Waltham transmitting station to Bakewell and the Peak District. It has recently been upgraded with the new tetra police radio antenna.

References
 

 Ali Cooper, Archaeology Walks in the Peak District 
 Percy Heathcote, Birchover: Its Prehistoric and Druidical Remains

Mountains and hills of Derbyshire
Mountains and hills of the Peak District
Peak District
Moorlands of England
Scheduled monuments in Derbyshire